Elvira, Mistress of the Dark may refer to:

 Elvira, Mistress of the Dark, a horror host character portrayed by Cassandra Peterson
 Elvira: Mistress of the Dark (film), a comedy-horror movie about the character
 Elvira: Mistress of the Dark (video game), a survival horror video game

See also
 Elvira: The Arcade Game, based on the film Elvira, Mistress of the Dark